Raj Rewal (born 24 November 1934) is a leading Indian architect.

Education
Rewal lived in Delhi and Shimla from 1934–1951. He attended Harcourt Butler higher secondary school. Between 1951-1954 he attended the Delhi School of Architecture in New Delhi. After completing a degree in architecture in New Delhi, he moved to London in 1955 where he lived until 1961. He attended the Architectural Association School of Architecture for one year and the Brixton School of Building, London from 1956-60. GD Goenka University also honour architect Raj Rewal with an honorary doctorate at a special convocation organised by University in India Habitat Centre.

Career
Raj Rewal worked at Michel Ecochard's office in Paris before starting his practice in New Delhi in 1962. Between 1963-72, he taught at the School of Planning and Architecture, Delhi. He opened a second office at Tehran, Iran in 1974. Among his better known projects are the Hall of Nations (Hall 6) at the Pragati Maidan Exhibition Centre, demolished in April 2017, Asiad Village Complex, National Institute of Immunology (NII), New Delhi; the Parliament Library in New Delhi and NCBS (National Centre for Biological Sciences) campus at Bangalore. In 1986, he became the curator of the exhibition "Traditional Architecture in India" for the Government of India organised festival of India in Paris. He also designed an architectural college (SIUPA) in Rohtak and is head of members in academic council. In 2018 his drawings and models were added to the New York Museum of Modern Art permanent collection, making him the first Indian architect represented.

Awards
 Gold Medal 1989 by the Indian Institute of Architects.
 Robert Mathew Award 1989 by the Commonwealth Association of Architects.
 Mexican Association of Architects award in 1993 for regional values.
 Architect of the Year 1994 Award by J.K. Trust for the design of World Bank Resident Mission building in New Delhi.
 Great Master's Award 1995 by J.K. Trust for lifetime contribution to Modern Architecture in the post independence era in India.
 Lifetime achievement award 2001 by the Institution of Engineers (India).
 IBC award 2002 by the Indian Building Congress for Excellence in Built Environment for Parliament Library building, New Delhi.
 Golden Architect Award 2003 by A+D and Spectrum Foundation
 Chevalier des Arts des Lettres award, 2005 by the French Government
Knight of the Legion of Honour
John Michael Kohler Life Time Achievement Award

Projects 

 Asian Games Village, New Delhi
 Bio Port, Sohna
 Central Institute of Education Technology, New Delhi
 Cidco Housing, Navi Mumbai
 Coal India Complex, Kolkata
 Delhi Metro Rail Corporation Headquarters, New Delhi
 Energy Technologies Center, NTPC Limited, Greater NOIDA
 Engineers India House, New Delhi
 Gas Training Institute, NOIDA
 French Embassy Staff Quarters, New Delhi
Satish Gujral House, New Delhi
GrapeCity - Japanese Software Center, NOIDA

 Hall of Nations, Pragati Maidan, New Delhi
 Indian Embassy, Beijing (China)
 Housing for British High Commission, New Delhi
Indian National Science Academy, New Delhi
International Centre for Genetic Engineering and Biotechnology, New Delhi
 Jang-e-Azadi Memorial and Museum, Kartarpur, Punjab
National Brain Research Institute, New Delhi
National Centre for Biological Sciences, New Delhi
 Lisbon Ismaili Centre, Lisbon (Portugal)
National Institute for Immunology, New Delhi
 National Institute of Public Finances and Policy, New Delhi
 NTPC Tower, NOIDA

 Parliament Library at Sansad Bhawan, New Delhi
 Rewal House, New Delhi
 Sahu Jain Pavilion, Pragati Maidan, New Delhi
 Sheikh Sarai Housing, New Delhi
 Sham Lal House, New Delhi
 Standing Conference of Public Enterprises Office Complex, New Delhi
State Trading Corporation building, New Delhi
 Television Centre (Doordarshan Bhawan), New Delhi
 Visual Arts Institutional Campus, Rohtak
World Bank Regional Mission, New Delhi

Books 
 Raj Rewal by Brain Brace Taylor
 Raj Rewal Selected Architecture Work
 Library for the Indian Parliament]
 Raj Rewal: Innovative Architecture and Tradition
 Talking Architecture: Raj Rewal in Conversation with Ramin Jahanbegloo
 Raj Rewal : Architecture climatiqu

See also
 Muzharul Islam
 B. V. Doshi
 Charles Correa
 Bashirul Haq

References

External links

 Official site
 The Designer of Secular India

Living people
1934 births
20th-century Indian architects
People from Hoshiarpur
Male artists from Punjab, India
21st-century Indian architects
Indian architects
School of Planning and Architecture, New Delhi alumni
20th-century Indian male artists
21st-century Indian male artists